Isaac Monroe Brown (born January 9, 1951) is a Canadian football player who played professionally for the Montreal Alouettes.

References

1951 births
Living people
Montreal Alouettes players